Hilliard "Hillyard" Mitchell (September 16, 1852 – March 2, 1923) was a politician from the Canadian prairies.

Hillyard was elected to the Legislative Assembly of Northwest Territories in the 1888 Northwest Territories general election. He beat opponent James Fisher 82 to 65 in a hotly contested vote to become the 1st member from the Batoche electoral district.

In the 1891 Northwest Territories general election James would run for a second term, this time switching to the new Mitchell electoral district. Hillyard would be acclaimed in this election and acclaimed 2 more times until his retirement from the legislature in 1898.

References

External links
Community Memories, Duck Lake Regional Interpretive Centre
 History of the Northwest Territories Legislative Assembly 1876 - 1905

Members of the Legislative Assembly of the Northwest Territories
1853 births
1923 deaths